Luis Ponce (6 June 1910 – 10 November 1974) was a Chilean footballer. He played in eight matches for the Chile national football team from 1937 to 1939. He was also part of Chile's squad for the 1937 South American Championship.

References

External links
 

1910 births
1974 deaths
Chilean footballers
Chile international footballers
Place of birth missing
Association football midfielders
Magallanes footballers